This article lists the lakes in the South Indian state, Tamil Nadu.

Note: Lakes grow and shrink due to precipitation, evaporation, releases, and diversions. For this reason, many of the surface areas tabulated below are very approximate. For reservoirs, the areas at maximum water storage are indicated. Reservoirs used for flood control are seldom allowed to reach maximum storage.

Coimbatore
 Singanallur Lake
 Valankulam Lake
 Perur Lake
 Ukkadam Big Lake
 Kumaraswamy Lake
 Sengulam Lake
 Periyakulam Lake
 Narsampathi lake

Erode
 Gani Ravuthar Lake
 Karuvilparai Lake
 Periyasadayampalayam Lake
 Muthampalayam Lake
 Kadayampatti Lake
 kavilipalayam Lake

Karur
 Dhathampalayam Lake
 Panjappatti Lake
 Velliyanai Lake

Cuddalore
 Wellington Lake
 Veeranam Lake
perumal nayakan lake

Villupuram
Thirukovilur lake
  Kaliveli Lake
 Padur lake
 Vilandai lake
Vellore
Saduperi Lake
Melmonavoor Kadaperi Lake 
Melmonavoor Periyeri Lake

Salem
Paniyeri lake
Mookaneri Lake
Panamarathupatty lake
Yercaud Lake

Kancheepuram (Kanchipuram)
 Thirupulivanam

 Magaral
 Sriperumpudur
 Madhuranthagam
 Chembarambakkam
 Uthiramerur
 Pallikaranai
 Mamundur 
 Sirudavur (Sirudavoor) 
 Santhavellore lake*
 Thirunelvelai Lake*
 Ponneri Lake 

Thiruvannamalai 
 Dhamal Lake*
Anukkavoor Lake*
Anapathur Lake*
Kilneli*

Namakkal
 Konneripatty Lake*

See also

 List of rivers in Tamil Nadu

Tamil Nadu
Lakes NAMAKKAL THOOSUR LAKE
Lists of tourist attractions in Tamil Nadu